Franklin M. McDonald  (1850–unknown) was a soldier in the U.S. Army during the Indian Wars and a recipient of the Medal of Honor for gallantry in defeating Indians who attacked the mail.

Biography
McDonald was born in 1850, in Bowling Green, Kentucky. He enlisted in Company G, 11th U.S. Infantry at Fort Griffin, Texas, on June 7, 1871.

On August 3, 1872, McDonald escorted a mail coach from Jacksboro, Texas, to Fort Griffin. Fifteen miles from Fort Belknap, it was attacked by a band of eight to 10 Kiowa Indians.

McDonald received the medal on September 8, 1872, without a formal ceremony and was promoted to Corporal. On December 4, 1873, McDonald deserted the Army and was never heard from again.

Medal of Honor citation

Rank and organization
Private,  Company G, 11th U.S. Infantry. Place and date:  Near Fort Griffin, Tex., 5 August 1872. Entered service at: Fort Griffin, Texas, on June 7, 1871. Birth: Bowling Green, Ky. Date of issue: 31 August 1872.

Citation
Gallantry in defeating Indians who attacked the mail.

See also

List of Medal of Honor recipients
List of Medal of Honor recipients for the Indian Wars
Kentucky Medal of Honor Memorial
Texas Medal of Honor Memorial

Notes

References
 Beyer, Walter Frederick, Deeds of Valor: From Records in the Archives of the United States Government; how American Heroes Won the Medal of Honor; History of Our Recent Wars and Explorations, from Personal Reminiscences and Records of Officers and Enlisted Men who Were Rewarded by Congress for Most Conspicuous Acts of Bravery on the Battle Field, on the High Seas and in Arctic Explorations, Volume 2, Perrien-Keydel Co., 1906.
 The Medal of Honor of the United States Army, United States Dept. of the Army, Public Information Division, U.S. Government Printing Office, 1948.
 Medal of honor, 1863-1968 "in the name of the Congress of the United States": prepared for the Subcommittee on Veterans' Affairs,United States Congress, Senate. Labor and Public Welfare, 1968.
 O'Neal, Bill, Fighting men of the Indian Wars: a biographical encyclopedia of the mountain men, soldiers, cowboys, and pioneers who took up arms during America's westward expansion, Barbed Wire Press, 1991.
 Neal, Charles M., Jr. Valor Across the Lone Star: The Congressional Medal of Honor in Frontier Texas, Texas A&M University Press: 2003.

External links

United States Army soldiers
American military personnel of the Indian Wars
United States Army Medal of Honor recipients
Year of death unknown
1850 births
People from Bowling Green, Kentucky
People from Texas
American Indian Wars recipients of the Medal of Honor